Daskalov is a surname. Notable people with the surname include:

Georgi Daskalov (born 1981),  Bulgarian footballer
Rayko Daskalov (1886–1923), Bulgarian interwar politician of the Bulgarian Agrarian National Union
Reyan Daskalov (born 1995), Bulgarian footballer

Bulgarian-language surnames